Ḥalā-'l Badr (or Hala-'l Bedr / Hallat al Badr, in ) is a volcano in northwestern Saudi Arabia at 27.25° N, 37.235° E. The volcano is of the cinder cone (or scoria-cone) type, and is on the northeast corner of the Thadra table mountain in the al-Jaww (الجاوّ) basin, an erosional divide between Harrat ar-Rahah (حرة الراحة ḥarratu ’r-raḥah) and Harrat al-'Uwayrid (حرة العويد ḥarratu ’r-‘ūwayrid). Its eruption history is currently unknown, but geological studies have shown that Hallat al Badr erupted some time during the Holocene period, and the most recent lava flows were in the al Jaww basin.

Writers including Charles Beke, Sigmund Freud, Immanuel Velikovsky, Colin HumphreysEduard Meyer, Martin Noth, and Hermann Gunkel have proposed that the biblical description of devouring fire on Mount Sinai refers to an erupting volcano in the land of biblical Midian. Gunkel writes, "The characteristic Israelite narratives of Yahweh's appearance in the burning thorn bush (Exod. 3:2), in the burning and smoking Sinai (Exod. 19:9, 20:18; Deut. 4:11), and especially in the pillars of smoke and fire (Exod. 13:21)... can be explained originally from the fact that, in Israel's earliest belief, Yahweh was the god of the Sinai volcano." This possibility would exclude all the peaks on the Sinai Peninsula and Mount Seir, but would match a number of places in northwestern Saudi Arabia, of which Hala-'l Badr is the most prominent.  Beke renounced his theory that Sinai was a volcano when he learned that Mount Baghir (also "Mountain of Light"), his volcanic Mount Sinai which was just northeast of the Gulf of Aqaba, was not a volcanic mountain after all.

In part, Humphreys' argument that Hallat al Badr is Mount Sinai rests on Alois Musils' argument that the itinerary stations given in Numbers 33 lead directly to Badr; he also reports that a volcano in the region erupted in 640 AD, but it is not known exactly which volcano this was.  James K. Hoffmeier argues that the route suggested by Humphreys would have put the supposed volcano behind the Israelites at times, not in front. He also notes that the words for "cloud" and "pillar of cloud" appear frequently in Numbers - it covers the mountain, the temple built on top of the mountain, "it occupies the holy of holies in Solomon's temple" and "Numbers 12:5 specifically refers to God coming down in a pillar of cloud to denounce Miriam's charges against Moses after departing the mountain of God." Thus "fire and cloud are understood to be vessels of theophany."

See also
Edomites

Citations and notes

External links
 Google Maps satellite view
  Graphs showing volcanic eruptions of the time, based on ice cores
 
Image of Hala 'l-Badr

Volcanoes of Saudi Arabia